Shidian is a neighborhood committee in Rudong County, part of Nantong city in Jiangsu Province of the China.

References

Township-level divisions of Jiangsu